The 2009 Golden Spin of Zagreb was the 42nd edition of an annual senior-level international figure skating competition held in Zagreb, Croatia. It was held at the Dom Sportova on December 10–12, 2009. Skaters competed in the disciplines of men's singles, ladies' singles, pair skating, and ice dancing. The compulsory dance was the Tango Romantica.

Results

Men

Ladies

Pairs

Ice dancing

External links
 
 2009 Golden Spin of Zagreb results
 2009 Golden Spin of Zagreb

Golden Spin Of Zagreb, 2009
Golden Spin Of Zagreb, 2009
2000s in Zagreb